Roy Ramsay may refer to:

Roy Ramsay (footballer) (born 1956), Australian rules footballer
Roy Ramsay (sailor) (1912–?), Bahamian Olympic sailor